The 2017 FIM Moto2 World Championship was a part of the 69th F.I.M. Road Racing World Championship season. 

The season was marred by the death of Stefan Kiefer, head of Kiefer Racing, in Malaysia. Johann Zarco was the reigning two-time series champion but he did not further defend his title as he joined the series' premier class, MotoGP.

The 2017 season was the first season for the KTM Moto2 chassis, after KTM expanded its factory operations to Moto2 and MotoGP.

Calendar
The following Grands Prix were scheduled to take place in 2017.

 ‡ = Night race

Calendar changes
 The Austrian and Czech Republic Grand Prix swapped places, with the Czech Republic hosting the tenth round, while Austria hosts the eleventh round.
 The British Grand Prix was scheduled to move from Silverstone to the new Circuit of Wales, but construction on the new track has not commenced. The two circuits reached a deal that will see Silverstone continue to host the British Grand Prix in 2017, with an option to host the 2018 race.

Teams and riders

A provisional list of team entrants for 2017 was released on 26 October 2016. All Moto2 competitors raced with an identical CBR600RR inline-four engine developed by Honda. Teams competed with tyres supplied by Dunlop.

Riders changes
 Isaac Viñales switched team to SAG Team, filling the spot vacated by the late Luis Salom. Remy Gardner has replaced Viñales in Tech 3 for 2017.
 Marcel Schrötter switched team to Dynavolt Intact GP, filling the spot vacated by Jonas Folger who moved up to MotoGP with Monster Yamaha Tech 3.
 Jorge Navarro moved up to Moto2 with Federal Oil Gresini Moto2, filling the spot vacated by Sam Lowes who was promoted to MotoGP with the Aprilia Gresini Team.
 Francesco Bagnaia and Stefano Manzi moved up to Moto2 with Sky Racing Team VR46.
 Miguel Oliveira switched team to Red Bull KTM Ajo, with 2016 Moto3 champion Brad Binder who has been promoted to Ajo's Moto2 team as Oliveira's teammate. Both will fill the spot vacated by Johann Zarco who moved up to MotoGP with Monster Yamaha Tech 3 after winning two consecutive Moto2 titles.
 Xavier Siméon switched from QMMF Racing Team to Tasca Racing Scuderia Moto2 for 2017 as a replacement for Remy Gardner.
 Fabio Quartararo moved up to Moto2 with Páginas Amarillas HP 40, filling the seat vacated by Álex Rins who moved up to MotoGP with Team Suzuki Ecstar.
 After spending his entire Moto2 career with Technomag (including after their merger with Interwetten Paddock in 2015), Dominique Aegerter has switched teams to Kiefer Racing.
 Andrea Locatelli moved up to Moto2 with the Italtrans Racing Team.
 Yonny Hernández joined AGR Team after losing his MotoGP seat at Pull & Bear Aspar Team to Karel Abraham, replacing Axel Pons who switched teams to RW Racing GP BV.
 Tetsuta Nagashima returned to Moto2 full-time with SAG Team, replacing Jesko Raffin who switched teams to CarXpert Interwetten.
 CarXpert Interwetten promotes Iker Lecuona with a full-season seat in the team after Lecuona becoming the replacement rider for Dominique Aegerter in 2016.
 Khairul Idham Pawi moved up to Moto2 with Idemitsu Honda Team Asia.
 Robin Mulhauser left Moto2 for the Supersport World Championship.
 2016 FIM Europe Supersport Cup champion Axel Bassani joined Moto2 with Speed Up Racing.

Team changes
 Ajo Motorsport switched to KTM bikes, with KTM making their Moto2 debut. KTM fielded two bikes for Brad Binder and Miguel Oliveira.
 Valentino Rossi's Sky Racing Team VR46 expanded to Moto2, fielding two Kalex bikes for Francesco Bagnaia and Stefano Manzi.
 SAG Team will field two bikes again, after running most of the 2016 season with only one bike due to Luis Salom's death at the Catalonia Grand Prix.
 After four years with Kalex, Dynavolt Intact GP switched to Suter.
 Leopard Racing will revert to their original name Kiefer Racing. In addition, they have also switched to Suter.
 Italtrans Racing Team competed with two bikes again in 2017, with Pasini and Locatelli riding.
 AGR Team have downsized to one bike in exchange for one slot in Moto3 for 2017.
 QMMF Racing Team withdrew from the championship. As a result of losing their customer, Speed Up Racing have expanded to two bikes.
 RW Racing GP switched from Moto3 to Moto2 for 2017.

Mid-season changes
 Danny Kent surprisingly left Kiefer Racing after not starting the Grand Prix of the Americas due to 'irreconcilable differences'. Federico Fuligni temporarily replaced him in Jerez before Kiefer Racing announced that Tarran Mackenzie will replace Kent for the remainder of the season. Kent returned to Moto2 with GaragePlus Interwetten replacing injured Iker Lecuona at the Italian Grand Prix. At the Austrian Grand Prix, Kent rejoined Moto2 to replace Marcel Schrötter at Dynavolt Intact GP.
 Ricard Cardús replaces Brad Binder at Red Bull KTM Ajo for 3 rounds. He also replaced Thomas Lüthi at CarXpert Interwetten in Valencia GP.
 Axel Bassani left Speed Up Racing after the French Grand Prix due to his bad results with the team, so he was replaced by Augusto Fernández for the rest of the season.
 Yonny Hernández left the AGR Team midway through the season due to inconsistent race results, managing only 16 points over 9 races. He will be replaced by the American Joe Roberts for the remainder of the season. After the Aragon Grand Prix, AGR Team folded for the rest of the season.

Results and standings

Grands Prix

Riders' standings
Scoring system
Points were awarded to the top fifteen finishers. A rider had to finish the race to earn points.

Constructors' standings
Points were awarded to the top fifteen finishers. A rider had to finish the race to earn points.

 Each constructor got the same number of points as their best placed rider in each race.

Notes

References

Moto2
Grand Prix motorcycle racing seasons